George Frederick Joffre Hartree (30 November 1914 – 27 October 1988), known as Charles Hawtrey, was an English actor, comedian, singer, pianist and theatre director.

Beginning at an early age as a boy soprano, he made several records before moving on to radio. His later career encompassed the theatre (as both actor and director), the cinema (where he regularly appeared supporting Will Hay in the 1930s and 1940s in films such as The Ghost of St. Michael's), through the Carry On films, and television.

Life and career

Early life
Born in Hounslow, Middlesex, England in 1914, to William John Hartree (1885–1952) and his wife Alice (née Crow) (1880–1965), of 217 Cromwell Road, as George Frederick Joffre Hartree, he took his stage name from the theatrical knight, Sir Charles Hawtrey, and encouraged the suggestion that he was his son. However, his father was actually a London car mechanic.

Following study at the Italia Conti Academy of Theatre Arts in London, he embarked on a career in the theatre as both actor and director.

1920s and 1930s
Hawtrey made his first appearance on the stage in Boscombe, a suburb of Bournemouth, as early as 1925. At the age of 11 he played a "street Arab" in Frederick Bowyer's fairy play The Windmill Man.

His London stage debut followed a few years later when, at the age of 18, he appeared in another "fairy extravaganza", this time at the Scala Theatre singing the role of the White Cat and Bootblack in the juvenile opera Bluebell in Fairyland. The music for this popular show had been written by Walter Slaughter in 1901, with a book by Seymour Hicks (providing part of the inspiration for J. M. Barrie's Peter Pan).

In Peter Pan at the London Palladium in 1931, Hawtrey played the First Twin, with leading parts taken by Jean Forbes-Robertson and George Curzon. This played in several regional theatres, including His Majesty's Theatre in Aberdeen. In 1936 Hawtrey played in a revival of the play, this time taking the larger role of Slightly, alongside the husband-and-wife partnership of Elsa Lanchester and Charles Laughton playing Peter and Hook. A review in The Daily Telegraph commended Hawtrey for having "a comedy sense not unworthy of his famous name".

Hawtrey played in Bats in the Belfry, a farce written by Diana Morgan and Robert MacDermott, which opened at the Ambassadors Theatre, Shaftesbury Avenue, on 11 March 1937. The cast included Ivor Barnard and Dame Lilian Braithwaite, as well as Vivien Leigh in the small part of Jessica Morton. The play ran for 178 performances at the Ambassadors Theatre before moving to the Hippodrome, Golders Green, Barnet on 16 August 1937.

Hawtrey acted in films from an early age, first appearing while still a child, and as an adult his youthful appearance and wit made him a foil to Will Hay's blundering old fool in the comedy films Good Morning, Boys (1937) and Where's That Fire? (1939). In all he appeared in more than 70 films, including from this period Alfred Hitchcock's Sabotage (1936).

Hawtrey had another success on stage when he was cast in the role of Gremio in Tyrone Guthrie's production of The Taming of the Shrew in 1939 at the Old Vic. (Roger Livesey starred as Petruchio and his wife, Ursula Jeans, as Katherine.)

Hawtrey was an accomplished musician. He recorded as a boy soprano and was billed as "The Angel-Voiced Choirboy" even at the age of fifteen. In 1930 he recorded several duets with the girl soprano Evelyn Griffiths (aged 11) for the Regal label. He was a semi-professional pianist for the Armed Forces during the Second World War.

1940s
Hawtrey continued in music revue, starring in Eric Maschwitz's New Faces (1940) at the Comedy Theatre in London, and was praised for his "chic and finished study of an alluring woman spy". New Faces included the premiere of the song "A Nightingale Sang in Berkeley Square", which quickly became a wartime favourite.

During and after the Second World War Hawtrey also appeared in the West End in such shows as Scoop, Old Chelsea, Merry England, Frou-Frou and Husbands Don't Count. Hawtrey also directed 19 plays, including Dumb Dora Discovers Tobacco at the Q Theatre in Richmond and, in 1945, Oflag 3, a war drama co-written with Douglas Bader.

By the 1940s, Hawtrey was appearing on radio during Children's Hour in the series Norman and Henry Bones, the Boy Detectives (first broadcast in 1943) alongside the actress Patricia Hayes. Later, he provided the voice of snooty Hubert Lane, the nemesis of William in the series Just William. His catchphrase was "How's yer mother off for dripping?"

Hawtrey's film career continued, but The Ghost of St. Michael's (1941) and The Goose Steps Out (1942) were his last films with Will Hay. After the latter film he asked Hay to give him bigger roles, but Hay refused.

Hawtrey also took a hand at directing films himself, including What Do We Do Now? (1945) a musical mystery written by the English author George Cooper and starring George Moon. Around the same time, Hawtrey directed Flora Robson in Dumb Dora Discovers Tobacco (1946). Both films are believed lost.

In 1948, Hawtrey appeared at the Windmill Theatre, Soho in comedy sketches presented as part of Revudeville.
In the same year, he was incorrectly credited as 'Major Markham', in The Story of Shirley Yorke, but, (see 'Filmography', and Edit Note), used two pseudonyms.

In 1949 he appeared as the bar-hand/piano player in the Ealing Comedy "Passport to Pimlico".

1950s
In 1956 Hawtrey appeared alongside his future "Carry On" co-star Hattie Jacques in the comedian Digby Wolfe's ATV series Wolfe at the Door, a 12-week sketch show. Not screened in London, it ran in the Midlands from 18 June to 10 September. In this series Wolfe explored the comic situations that could be found by passing through doorways, into a theatrical dressing room, for example. The programmes were written by Tony Hawes and Richard Waring.

That same year, Hawtrey made a brief appearance in Tess and Tim (BBC) under the Saturday Comedy Hour banner. This short-run series starred the music hall comedians Tessie O'Shea and Jimmy Wheeler. In 1957, Hawtrey appeared in a one-off episode of Laughter in Store (BBC), this time working with Charlie Drake and Irene Handl.

Hawtrey's television career gained a major boost with The Army Game, in which he played the part of Private 'Professor' Hatchett. Loosely based on the film Private's Progress (1956), the series followed the fortunes of a mixed bag of army National Service conscripts in residence at Hut 29 of the Surplus Ordnance Depot at Nether Hopping in remote Staffordshire. 
I Only Arsked! (1958) was a feature film spin-off. Hawtrey left the series in 1958.

1960s
In Our House (1960–62) Hawtrey played a council official, Simon Willow. The series was created by Norman Hudis, the screenwriter for the first six Carry On films. Hattie Jacques and Joan Sims also starred. The series initially ran for 13 episodes from September to December 1960, returning the following year with Bernard Bresslaw and Hylda Baker added to the cast. Of the 39 episodes transmitted, only three survive.

Best of Friends (ITV, 1963) had essentially the same writers and production team as Our House. Hawtrey again acted alongside Hylda Baker but this time playing the role of Charles, a clerk in an insurance office, next door to a café run by Baker. She accompanied him on insurance assignments and protected him when he was feeling put upon by his Uncle Sidney, who wished to but could not, dismiss his nephew. The series ran to thirteen episodes (all lost) and was the last television series in which Hawtrey had a regular role.

By this time, Hawtrey had become a regular in the "Carry On" films series. He was in the first, Carry On Sergeant (1958), and more than twenty others. His characters ranged from the wimpish through the effete to the effeminate and would always, regardless of the historical setting, be seen wearing Hawtrey's signature round glasses. In her autobiography, Barbara Windsor wrote about Hawtrey's alcoholism and his outrageous flirting with the footballer George Best. While filming Carry On Spying (1964), in which they played secret agents, Windsor thought that Hawtrey had fainted with fright over a dramatic scene on a conveyor belt. In fact, he had passed out because he was drunk. When he came on set with a crate of R. White's Lemonade everyone knew that he had been on another binge. He smoked Woodbines and played cards between takes with Sid James and other members of the cast. In 1965, Hawtrey's mother Alice died and Hawtrey was grief-stricken and started drinking more. Apparently, Hawtrey could often be heard talking to his mother in his dressing room, even though she had died.

Gerald Thomas, the director of the "Carry On" films explained in 1966 that "In the beginning Charles's shock entrance was an accident, but realising the potential I set out deliberately to shock and now his first appearance is carefully planned.... Apart from the comedy value of the unlikely role he plays, I'm careful to arrange the right timing for his actual appearance, so that the two factors combined surprise the audience into instant risibility." In the mid-1960s, Hawtrey performed in the British regional tour of the stage musical A Funny Thing Happened on the Way to the Forum, which also included his "Carry On" co-star Kenneth Connor.

Later life and career
Although the "Carry On" films made a handsome return for their producer, Peter Rogers, the cast were not well remunerated, commonly receiving a standard fee of £5,000 per film. Hawtrey used public transport to get to and from work and was once given a lift to Pinewood Studios by Laurence Olivier. Requested to embrace Barbara Windsor at a meeting with the press, Hawtrey hurriedly left the room requesting a man in her place.

Hawtrey moved in 1968 to Deal, in Kent, reputedly because of the sailors at the local naval base. He lived at 117 Middle Street, Deal, where he remained until his death. There is a small commemorative blue plaque on the front exterior wall of this property to identify his former residence. Hawtrey cut an eccentric figure in the small town, becoming well known for promenading along the seafront in extravagant attire, waving cheerfully to the fishermen and for frequenting establishments patronised by students of the Royal Marines School of Music.

In 1970, he appeared with Sid James in the South African film Stop Exchange. He made an appearance in Grasshopper Island (ITV 1971), a children's programme, alongside Patricia Hayes, Julian Orchard, Tim Brooke-Taylor and Frank Muir. Filmed in Wales and Corsica, this adventure series featured three small brothers nicknamed Toughy, Smarty and Mouse who run away to find an uninhabited island.

Hawtrey's last film was Carry On Abroad (1972), after which he was dropped from the series. Hoping to gain higher billing, Hawtrey withdrew from a television programme, Carry On Christmas, in which he was scheduled to appear, giving just a few days' notice. Peter Rogers, the producer of the "Carry On" films and shows, said "He became rather difficult and impossible to deal with because he was drinking a lot. We used to feed him black coffee before he would go on. It really became clear that we were wasting time". Hawtrey's alcohol consumption had noticeably increased since Carry On Cowboy (1965), which was released the year his mother died.

Without steady film work, Hawtrey performed in pantomime and summer seasons in the regions, playing heavily on his "Carry On" persona in such shows as Carry On Holiday Show-time and Snow White at the Gaiety Theatre, Rhyl in Wales (summer 1970), Stop it Nurse at the Pavilion Theatre, Torquay (1972) and Snow White and the Seven Dwarfs again at the Theatre Royal, Nottingham (April 1974). His last pantomime season was Christmas 1979.

Hawtrey also played parts in a series of radio plays about a criminal gang written by Wally K. Daly for the BBC, alongside Peter Jones, Lockwood West and Bernard Bresslaw. These were Burglar's Bargains (1979), A Right Royal Rip-off (1982) and The Bigger They Are (1985).

Personal life
Little is known about Hawtrey's early years or later private life. He guarded his relationships very carefully in an era (lasting until 1967 in England)  when male homosexual sex was illegal and punishable by a prison sentence. His outrageous drunken promiscuity did not attract sympathy, nor did his general peevish demeanour and increasing eccentricity earn him many close friends.

If fans asked him for an autograph, Hawtrey would often swear at them and rip their paper in half.

Kenneth Williams recounted a visit to Deal in Kent where Hawtrey owned a house full of old brass bedsteads that the eccentric actor had hoarded, believing that "one day he would make a great deal of money from them".

Hawtrey spent most of his life living with his mother, who suffered Alzheimer's disease in later years. Another anecdote recounted by Williams describes how during the filming of Carry On Teacher, Joan Sims cried out to Hawtrey that his mother's handbag had caught fire after her cigarette ash fell into it. Without batting an eyelid, Hawtrey poured a cup of tea into the bag to put out the flames, snapped the handbag shut and continued with his conversation. He would often bring his mother onto the set and then lock her in his dressing room when he was required to film a scene.  Williams also recounted his gathering up of the sandwiches left over from a buffet for the "Carry On" cast. Williams was envious of Hawtrey's acceptance of his sexuality: "He can sit in a bar and pick up sailors and have a wonderful time. I couldn't do it."

In the spring of 1984, Hawtrey suffered a heart-attack. Hawtrey hit the headlines after his house caught fire on 5 August 1984. He had gone to bed with a 15-year-old rent boy and had left a cigarette burning on his sofa. Newspaper photographs from the time show a fireman leading an ill-looking, emotional, partially clothed and toupeeless Hawtrey to safety. Hawtrey told the press that "The smell of smoke woke me up and there were flames coming up the stairway. I've lost a lot of valuable antiques and sentimental keepsakes but I am all right. It was all very frightening".

Death
On 24 October 1988, Hawtrey collapsed in the doorway of the Royal Hotel in Deal, shattering his femur, and was rushed by ambulance to the Buckland Hospital in Dover. He was discovered to be suffering from peripheral vascular disease, a condition of the arteries brought on by a lifetime of heavy smoking. Hawtrey was told that to save his life, his legs would have to be amputated. He refused the operation, allegedly saying that he preferred 'to die with his boots on', and died three days later, aged 73, in a nursing home in Walmer, near Deal. It was claimed that on his deathbed he threw a vase at his nurse who asked for an autograph. He was cremated and his ashes were scattered in Mortlake Crematorium, close to Chiswick in London. Just nine mourners attended; no friends or family were there.

Legacy

Hawtrey was portrayed by Hugh Walters in the television film Cor, Blimey! (2000). This was adapted by Terry Johnson from his stage play Cleo, Camping, Emmanuelle and Dick (1998); the original play did not feature Hawtrey as a character. In the BBC Four television play Kenneth Williams: Fantabulosa! (2006), Hawtrey was played by David Charles.

He is also the subject of one-man biographical stage play, Oh, Hello!, premiered in 2001 at The Torch Theatre and was revived in 2014/2015 for the actor's centenary, with Jamie Rees in the role. The play was written by Dave Ainsworth 

He has been the subject of two biographies: Charles Hawtrey 1914–1988: The Man Who Was Private Widdle (2002) by Roger Lewis and Whatshisname: The Life and Death of Charles Hawtrey (2010) by the broadcaster Wes Butters. BBC Radio 4 broadcast Butters's documentary, Charles Hawtrey: That Funny Fella with the Glasses, in April 2010.

Reference was made to Hawtrey by John Lennon (seemingly nonsensically) just before the song "Two of Us" on the Beatles' Let It Be album. John says: "I Dig a Pygmy, by Charles Hawtrey and The Deaf-Aids. Phase one, in which Doris gets her oats.”

Filmography

Tell Your Children (1922) as minor role (uncredited)
This Freedom (1923) (uncredited)
Marry Me (1932) as Billy Hart
The Melody-Maker (1933) as Torn
Mayfair Girl (1933)
Smithy (1933)
High Finance (1933)
As Good As New (1934)
Trouble in Store (1934)
Hyde Park (1934) as Secondary Supporting Role (uncredited)
Little Stranger (1934)
Murder at Monte Carlo (1935)
Boys Will Be Boys (1935)
Kiddies on Parade (1935)
Windfall (1935) (minor role, uncredited)
Man of the Moment (1935) as Tom (uncredited)
Get Off My Foot (1935)
Well Done, Henry (1936) as Rupert McNab
Cheer Up (1936) as dancing Boy Scout (uncredited)
The Brown Wallet (1936)  (bit part, uncredited)
Sabotage (1936) as studious youth at the aquarium (uncredited)
Good Morning, Boys (1937) as Septimus
Melody and Romance (1937) reciting Shakespeare at audition (uncredited)
Where's That Fire? (1940) as Woodley
Jailbirds (1940) as Nick
The Ghost of St. Michael's (1941) as Percy Thorne
The Goose Steps Out (1942) as Max
Let the People Sing (1942) as Young Orton
Much Too Shy (1942) as student of Modern Art (uncredited)
Bell-Bottom George (1943) as BBC man (uncredited)
A Canterbury Tale (1944) as Thomas Duckett
Ten Year Plan (1945)
Meet Me at Dawn (1947) as reporter at the fair (uncredited)
The End of the River (1947) as Raphael
The Story of Shirley Yorke (1948) (Major Markham) ('Sibelius' and 'Mendelssohn', ((as the Piano Player)): pseudonyms)
Passport to Pimlico (1949) as Bert Fitch
The Lost People (1949) as prisoner (uncredited)
Dark Secret (1949) as Arthur Figson
Room to Let (1950) as Mike Atkinson
Smart Alec (1951) as Farr
The Galloping Major (1951) as Lew Rimmel
Hammer the Toff (1952) as cashier (uncredited)
Brandy for the Parson (1952) as George Crumb
You're Only Young Twice (1952) as Adolphus Hayman
Five Days (1954) as Bill (uncredited)
To Dorothy a Son (1954) as waiter at pub (uncredited)
As Long as They're Happy (1955) as Teddyboy
Timeslip / The Atomic Man (1955) as office-boy (uncredited)
Simon and Laura (1955) as railway porter
Man of the Moment (1955) as play director (uncredited)
Jumping for Joy (1956) as punter at bar (uncredited)
Who Done It? (1956) as disc jockey
The March Hare (1956) as Fisher
Carry On Sergeant (1958) as Peter Golightly
I Only Arsked! (1958) as Pvt. 'Professor' Hatchett
Carry On Nurse (1959) as Humphrey Hinton
Carry On Teacher (1959) as Michael Bean
Please Turn Over (1959) as Jeweler
Inn for Trouble (1960) as Silas Withering
Carry On Constable (1960) as PC Timothy Gorse
Carry On Regardless (1961) as Gabriel Dimple
Dentist on the Job (1961) as Mr. Roper
What a Whopper (1961) as Arnold
Carry On Cabby (1963) as Terry 'Pintpot' Tankard
Carry On Jack (1963) as Walter Sweetly
Carry On Spying (1964) as Charlie Bind
Carry On Cleo (1964) as Seneca
Carry On Cowboy (1965) as Chief Big Heap
Carry On Screaming! (1966) as Dan Dann
Carry On Don't Lose Your Head (1966) as Duc de Pommfrit
The Terrornauts (1967) as Joshua Yellowlees
Carry On Follow That Camel (1967) as Captain Le Pice
Carry On Doctor (1967) as Mr. Barron
Carry On Up the Khyber (1968) as Pte. James Widdle
Carry On Camping (1969) as Charlie Muggins
Carry On Again Doctor (1969) as Doctor Ernest Stoppidge
Zeta One (1969) as Swyne
Carry On Up the Jungle (1970) as Tonka the Great / Walter Bagley
Stop Exchange (1970) as The Butler
Carry On Loving (1970) as James Bedsop
Carry On Henry (1971) as Sir Roger de Lodgerley
Carry On at Your Convenience (1971) as Charles Coote
Carry On Matron (1972) as Dr. Francis A. Goode
Carry On Abroad (1972) as Eustace Tuttle

Television credits
Tess and Time (1956) 
Wolfe at the Door (1956) 
Laughter in Store (1957) 
The Army Game (1957–1958) as Pvt. 'Professor' Hatchett
Our House (1960) as Simon Willow
Best of Friends (1963) as Charles
Ghosts of Christmas or Carry On Christmas (1969) as Spirit of Christmas Past / Angel / Convent Girl
Carry On Long John (1970)
Grasshopper Island (1970)
The Princess and the Pea (1979) 
The Plank (1979) as Co-Driver
Runaround (1981) 
Super Gran: "Supergran and the State Visit" (1987) as Clarence, Duke of Claridge (final television appearance)

References

External links

 
 
 
 
 The Army Game and Our House at Television Heaven.
 Charles Hawtrey  at The Boy Choir and Soloist Directory.
 Charles Hawtrey at Aveleyman.

1914 births
1988 deaths
Alumni of the Italia Conti Academy of Theatre Arts
Boy sopranos
English male comedians
English male film actors
English male stage actors
English male television actors
English gay actors
English gay musicians
Gay comedians
Gay singers
People from Hounslow
British Army personnel of World War II
20th-century English male actors
20th-century English male singers
British male comedy actors
20th-century English comedians
English LGBT singers
English LGBT comedians
Accidental deaths from falls
20th-century English LGBT people